John Arthur Pryor (5 November 1884 – ?) was a British Major and aristocrat, He resided at Bentworth Hall in Bentworth, East Hampshire and at Beamhurst Hall in Beamhurst, East Staffordshire with his wife Blanche Marion, their son and two daughters, between 1925 and 1930.

References

Devonshire Regiment officers
1884 births
Year of death missing
People from Bentworth
People from the Borough of East Staffordshire
English brewers